Olt County is a county (județ) of Romania on the border with Bulgaria, in the historical regions of Oltenia and Muntenia (the regions are separated by the Olt river). The capital city is Slatina.

History 
On 24 August 2017, the Olt County Council decided to hold a name referendum on 15 October 2017 for the proposal to change the county name to "Olt-Romanați". The referendum was eventually held on 6 and 7 October 2018. The vote was nullified, as turnout was 27.19%, below the required threshold of 30%; therefore, the Olt County retains its current name.

Demographics 

 Romanians - 98.06%
 Romani - 1.86%
 Other minorities - 0.08%

The county is a mainly rural one, with over 60% of the population living in villages.

Geography 

The county lies in a flat area on the western part of the Romanian Plain. It is crossed by rivers from north to south, the main one - the Olt River giving the county its name. The Danube forms a wide valley in the south, with many ponds and small channels, which are occasionally flooded.

Neighbours 

 Teleorman County to the East.
 Dolj County to the West.
 Argeș County and Vâlcea County to the North.
 Bulgaria to the South - Vratsa Province and Pleven Province.

Economy 
The predominant industries in the county are:
 Metallurgy - aluminium and aluminium components.
 Railway equipment.
 Food and beverages industry.
 Textile industry.
 Mechanical components industry.

Agriculture is the main occupation in the county - over 58% of the population having agriculture as their main occupation. Both extensive agriculture, and small-scale, vegetables and fruits, are practiced. The area is well suited for irrigation.

Tourism 
The main destinations for tourists are:
 The city of Slatina.
 Fishing on the Danube and on the Olt River.
 Town of Corabia with an ancient Roman citadel, a large orthodox cathedral, Danube sunbathes, sailing and fishing.
 The town of Scornicești - the birthplace of Nicolae Ceaușescu.

Politics
The Olt County Council, renewed at the 2020 local elections, consists of 32 counsellors, with the following party composition:

Administrative divisions 

Olt County has 2 municipalities, 6 towns and 104 communes:
Municipalities
Caracal
Slatina - capital city; population: 87,608 (as of 2007)

Towns
Balș
Corabia
Drăgănești-Olt
Piatra Olt
Potcoava
Scornicești

Communes
Băbiciu
Baldovinești
Bălteni
Bărăști
Bârza
Bobicești
Brâncoveni
Brastavățu
Brebeni
Bucinișu
Cârlogani
Călui
Cezieni
Cilieni
Colonești
Corbu
Coteana
Crâmpoia
Cungrea
Curtișoara
Dăneasa
Deveselu
Dobrețu
Dobrosloveni
Dobroteasa
Dobrun
Drăghiceni
Făgețelu
Fălcoiu
Fărcașele
Găneasa
Găvănești
Gârcov
Giuvărăști
Ghimpețeni
Gostavățu
Grădinari
Grădinile
Grojdibodu
Gura Padinii
Ianca
Iancu Jianu
Icoana
Ipotești
Izbiceni
Izvoarele
Leleasca
Mărunței
Mihăești
Milcov
Morunglav
Movileni
Nicolae Titulescu
Obârșia
Oboga
Oporelu
Optași-Măgura
Orlea
Osica de Sus
Osica de Jos
Pârșcoveni
Perieți
Pleșoiu
Poboru
Priseaca
Radomirești
Redea
Rotunda
Rusănești
Sâmburești
Sârbii-Măgura
Scărișoara
Schitu
Seaca
Șerbănești
Slătioara
Șopârlița
Spineni
Sprâncenata
Ștefan cel Mare
Stoenești
Stoicănești
Strejești
Studina
Tătulești
Teslui
Tia Mare
Topana
Traian
Tufeni
Urzica
Vădastra
Vădăstrița
Vâlcele
Valea Mare
Văleni
Verguleasa
Vișina
Vișina Nouă
Vitomirești
Vlădila
Voineasa
Vulpeni
Vulturești

Historical county

Historically, the county was located in the southern part of Greater Romania, in the western part of the historical region of Muntenia, around and in the south of Bucharest. The county included the north-eastern part of the current Olt county, the south-western part of the present Argeș County and the north-western part of the present Teleorman County. During the interwar years, it was bordered to the north by Argeș County, to the east by the counties of Argeş and Teleorman, to the south by Teleorman County, and in the west by the counties of Romanați and Vâlcea.

Administration

The county originally was divided into three administrative districts (plăși):
Plasa Drăgănești, headquartered at Drăgănești
Plasa Dumitrești, headquartered at Dumitrești
Plasa Spineni, headquartered at Spineni

Subsequently, the county established an additional district:Plasa Mijlocul, headquartered at Mijlocul

Population 
According to the 1930 census data, the county population was 183,595 inhabitants, ethnically divided as follows: 98.2% Romanians, 1.2% Romanies, as well as other minorities. From the religious point of view, the population was 99.5% Eastern Orthodox, 0.2% Roman Catholic, 0.1% Jewish, as well as other minorities.

Urban population 
In 1930, the county's urban population was 11,243 inhabitants, comprising 92.5% Romanians, 2.5% Hungarians, 1.5% Jews, 0.8% Germans, as well as other minorities. From the religious point of view, the urban population was composed of 94.1% Eastern Orthodox, 2.3% Roman Catholic, 1.6% Jewish, 0.9% Reformed, 0.6% Lutheran, as well as other minorities.

References

 
Counties of Romania
Geography of Wallachia
1879 establishments in Romania
1938 disestablishments in Romania
1940 establishments in Romania
1950 disestablishments in Romania
1968 establishments in Romania
States and territories established in 1879
States and territories disestablished in 1938
States and territories established in 1940
States and territories disestablished in 1950
States and territories established in 1968